Danny Barber (born May 17, 1971 in Bellflower, California) is a retired U.S. soccer midfielder who played one game with the MetroStars in Major League Soccer.  He spent most of his career playing indoor soccer in the Continental Indoor Soccer League, National Professional Soccer League and second Major Indoor Soccer League.

Youth
Barber graduated from Pacifica High School in Garden Grove, California.  He then attended UNLV, playing on the men's soccer team from 1989 to 1992. He holds the school's career assists record with 26.

Professional
He joined the roster of the newly established Las Vegas Dustdevils in the Continental Indoor Soccer League.  That season, the Dustdevils won the CISL championship  He continued to play for the Dustdevils in 1995.

In February 1996, the MetroStars selected Barber in the 3rd round (22nd overall) of the 1996 MLS Supplemental Draft.  He played one game for them.

In the fall of 1996, he signed with Cincinnati Silverbacks in the National Professional Soccer League.  The Silverbacks folded following the 1997–1998 season and Barber moved to the Buffalo Blizzard.  He remained with the Blizzard until the team folded in the spring of 2001.  He then began the 2001–2002 season with the Baltimore Blast in the newly established Major Indoor Soccer League.  He played twenty-one games for the Blast before being traded to the Harrisburg Heat in exchange for Lester Felician on February 18, 2002.  He finished the season in Harrisburg. On September 9, 2002, the Heat traded Barber, the rights to Justin Labrum and financial considerations to the Dallas Sidekicks in exchange for Marco Coria, Genoni Martinez and Raul Salas.  He played nine games for the Sidekicks at the beginning of the 2002–2003 season before being released on October 14, 2002.  On December 2, 2002 the Baltimore Blast signed Barber to a 15-day/5-game contract.  He played four of those five games then was released.  On July 23, 2003, the St. Louis Steamers  selected Barber in the 11th Round of the 2003 MISL Expansion Draft.  However, he never played for the team.

References

External links
MetroStars player profile
Dallas Sidekicks player profile

1971 births
Living people
American soccer players
Baltimore Blast (2001–2008 MISL) players
Buffalo Blizzard players
Continental Indoor Soccer League players
Dallas Sidekicks (2001–2008 MISL) players
Harrisburg Heat players
Las Vegas Dustdevils players
Major Indoor Soccer League (2001–2008) players
Major League Soccer players
New York Red Bulls players
National Professional Soccer League (1984–2001) players
UNLV Rebels men's soccer players
New York Red Bulls draft picks
Association football midfielders